Yusuf (Arabic synonym of "Joseph") is the 12th chapter (Surah) of the Quran and has 111 Ayahs (verses). It is preceded by sūrah Hud and followed by Ar-Ra’d (The thunder).

Regarding the timing and contextual background of the believed revelation (asbāb al-nuzūl), it was revealed toward the end of the Meccan period, which means it is believed to have been revealed in Mecca, instead of later in Medina. It is said to have been revealed in a single sitting and is unique in this respect. The text narrates the story of Yusuf (Joseph), son of Jacob, who is a prophet in Islam, and recounts his life and mission.

Unlike the accounts of other Islamic prophets, different elements and aspects of which are related in different surahs, the life-history of Yusuf, is narrated in this surah only, in full and in chronological order. This surah, which also tells of the truth, according to Muslims, contained in dreams, presents many principles of how to serve Islam by relating the life-history of a prophet, who became the most renowned and respected figure in the country to which he had been sold as a slave.

The surah was first translated into Latin by Thomas van Erpe in 1617 and later in the 17th century published synoptically in Arabic and Latin as part of the Lutheran efforts at translating the Qur'an.

Summary

1-3 The Prophet is acquainted by inspiration with the history of Joseph
4 Joseph tells his father of his vision of eleven stars and the sun and the moon bowing down to him
5 Jacob warns Joseph against the jealousy of his brethren
6 Jacob understands the dream to signify Joseph’s future prophetic character
7 Joseph’s story is a sign of God’s providence
8 Joseph’s brethren are jealous of him and of Benjamin
9 They counsel together to kill or to expatriate him
10 One of them advises their putting him into a well
11-12 They beg their father to send Joseph with them
13  Jacob hesitates through fear that Joseph may be devoured by a wolf
14-15  Joseph’s brethren, receiving their father’s consent, take him with them and put him in a well
15  God sends a revelation to Joseph in the well
16-17  The brethren bring to Jacob the report that Joseph had been devoured by a wolf
18  Jacob does not believe the story of his sons
19-20  Certain travelers finding Joseph carry him into bondage
21  An Egyptian purchases Joseph and proposes to adopt him
22  God bestows on his wisdom and knowledge
23  The Egyptian’s wife endeavors to seduce Joseph
24 By God’s grace he was preserved from her enticements
25  She accuses Joseph of an attempt to dishonor her
26-27 The rent in his garment testifies Joseph’s innocence
28-29  Azeez believes Joseph and condemns his wife
30  The sin of Azeez’s wife becomes known in the city
31  The wives of other noblemen, seeing Joseph’s beauty, call him an angel
32  Azeez’s wife declares her purpose to imprison Joseph unless he yields to her solicitations
33  Joseph seeks protection from God
34 God hears his prayer and turns aside their snares
35  Joseph imprisoned notwithstanding his innocence
36-37 He undertakes to interpret the dreams of two of the king’s servants who were also imprisoned with him
  38-40 Joseph preaches the Divine unity to his fellow-prisoners
  41 He interprets the dreams of the two servants
  42 Joseph asks to be remembered by the king but is forgotten
  43 The dreams of the king of Egypt
  44 The king’s interpreters fail to interpret the king’s dream
  45-49 Joseph remembers and interprets the king’s dream
  50 The king calls Joseph out of prison
 51  The women of the palace acknowledge their sin in endeavoring to entice Joseph to unlawful love
  52-53 Joseph vindicated. The wife of Azeez does not acquit herself of blame.
 54  The king restores Joseph
  55-57 Joseph made king’s treasurer at his own request
  58 His brethren come to him but do not recognize him
  59-61 Joseph requires his brethren to bring to him their brother Benjamin
 62  Their money returned in their sacks to induce their return
 63-66  Jacob reluctantly permits Benjamin to go to Egypt with his brethren
 67  Jacob counsels their entering the city by several gates
 68  This counsel of no avail against God’s decree
 69  Joseph, receiving Benjamin, makes himself known to him
70-76  He, by guile, brings his brethren under the charge of theft 	
77, 79  He insists on retaining Benjamin instead of a substitute 	
80-82  After consultation, Benjamin’s brethren all return to Jacob but one 	
83  Jacob refuses to credit their story, yet puts his trust in God
84-86  Jacob grieves for Joseph, and yet tells of his hope
87  Jacob sends his sons to inquire after Joseph
88-90  Joseph makes himself known to his brethren
91-93  He pardons his brethren and sends his inner garment to his father to restore his sight
94-97  Jacob foretells the finding of Joseph and receives his sight
 98-99 He asks pardon for his wicked sons
100  Joseph receives his parents unto him in Egypt
101  Jacob and his sons and wife all do obeisance to Joseph
102  Joseph praises God for his mercies and professes the Muslim faith
103-107  The infidels will not believe the signs of the Qurán
108 God's order to the messenger to proclaim the Muslim faith
109  God’s apostles in all ages have been but men
109-110  Unbelievers invariably punished for rejecting the messengers of God
111  The Quran no forgery, but a confirmation of the writings of former prophets

Narrative
The story  Prophet Yūsuf. Yūsuf is one of the sons of Ya'qub who has the talent of interpreting dreams. One day Yūsuf has a dream and he narrates his dream to his father, who immediately knows that Yūsuf will be a prophet. His father tells him not to tell his brothers to avoid any harm. However, because of Ya'qub's loving treatment towards Yūsuf, Yūsuf's brothers felt jealous. They wanted to get rid of Yūsuf, so their father could love them instead of Yūsuf. Their initial plan was to kill Yūsuf, but later they decided to throw him in a well. They lied to their father and told him that a wolf had killed him. Later, a caravan rescued Yūsuf from the well, who then sold him to a 'Al-Aziz in Egypt. The 'Al-Aziz took Yūsuf in and was hoping to either put him to work or adopt him as a son. Later, the man's wife tries to seduce Yūsuf, but he resists. The woman seeing his resistance accuses Yūsuf of wanting to harm her and demands that he should either be punished severely or sent to jail.

A witness, after Yūsuf defends his innocence, testifies "if his shirt is torn from the front, then she has told the truth, and he is of the liars but if his shirt is torn from the back, then she has lied, and he is of the truthful." The shirt was indeed torn from the back. Soon after this accident, the women of the city talk of how the wife is seeking to seduce Yūsuf. The wife of 'Al-Aziz invites them to a banquet, gives each of them a knife, and then tells Yūsuf to come out. The women cut their hands in astonishment.  'She said, "That is the one about whom you blamed me. And I certainly sought to seduce him, but he firmly refused; and if he will not do what I order him, he will surely be imprisoned and will be of those debased."  Yūsuf prefers prison to what they call him so he prayed to God. Yūsuf is sent to prison.

In the prison, Yūsuf met two other men and interprets one of the prisoner's dreams. The prisoner is then released and Yūsuf asked the prisoner to mention his talent to the king. One day, the King had a dream and the prisoner who had been released mention Yūsuf. He interprets the King's dream, which is about Egypt having a seven-year drought. To reward him, the King requests his release from jail and the King also investigates his case. The wife who tried to seduce Yūsuf testifies that he was innocent, and the truth unveils. Yūsuf is given authority in Egypt.

During the seven-year drought, Yūsuf's brothers visit Egypt to get food for their family. Upon seeing his brothers, Yūsuf recognizes them though they did not recognize him. Yūsuf, in a high position of authority, requests that the next time they come, they bring their youngest brother Benjamin with them. When the brothers returned with their youngest brother, Yūsuf takes him aside and tells him his identity. Yūsuf plots a theft case where his youngest brother is found guilty of theft when he is truly innocent and is detained from his family, so he could stay with him. Later, when the father and brothers face poverty they come back to Yūsuf and Yūsuf then helps them and reveals his identity asking them to come and live with him.

Revelation

There is no confirmed time when Surah Yūsuf was supposedly revealed, but it is estimated to be either in the 10th or 11th year of dawah. In other words, it is known to have been revealed 2 or 3 years before the hijrah (Migration) from Makkah to Madina which is close to the end of the Makkan era and Makkan journey. This Sura was revealed after a year the scholars of seerah call 'am al huzun' (the year of Sorrow or Despair). This year was a sad and depressing time for the Islamic prophet Muhammad. He was going through several hardships and three of those are the most significant. The first one is his uncle Abu Talib's death. Abu Talib was the only father figure he had left and one of the people who protected him from the harms of society. The second tragedy would come with his beloved first wife, Khadijah's death. She was the first to believe in his message and she was his comfort. The two deaths were a significant loss to him as they were the people in his life that motivated and protected him through his journey. Later on in Makkah after his uncle's death, the pagans made him face excessive hardships while he tried to call the people to Islam. Expecting a better reply from the city of Ta'if, Muhammad departs Makkah. However, to his disappointment, the people of Ta'if did not welcome him, gave him a hard time and chased him out of the city by throwing rocks at him. He was injured, bleeding and left with nothing but disappointment from the people of Ta'if. This sura was meant to uplift his spirits and comfort him in his time of rejection.

Other findings
Along with the three crucial events that marked the revelation for Muhammad, scholars have mentioned other incidents that led to the revelation of the sura. The Quraysh wanted to test Muhammad, as they were in disbelief of his knowledge and spiritual capabilities. They did not believe him to be a prophet and planned to trick him by asking a question that only a true prophet would be able to answer. The story of Yūsuf and his brothers, was one that was not heard of, as the people of Makkah held no knowledge of this story. Also translated as Joseph (son of Jacob) it was known to the Christian and Jewish cultures and not heard of by the Quraysh. To recite this story would show true prophecy, but people had no faith that Muhammad would possess this gift. When Muhammad was questioned, he revealed through his revelation all his knowledge about the untold story.
Following the hardships faced within the city of Makkah, the story of Yūsuf was later revealed to uplift people's spirits. They questioned, "O Messenger of Allah, why don't you tell us the stories of those before us who also suffered?" This was a time of abrupt chaos as the Muslims were being persecuted and later forced to leave. This is posed as the second conclusion to the revelation.

Hadith culture

It has been narrated by Ja'far al-Sadiq, a great-grandson of Muhammad, that the individual who recites Surah Yūsuf during every day or every night will be resurrected on the Day of Judgement with beauty resembling the beauty of Yūsuf. He will not fear the Day of Judgement and will be among the best of the believers.

Muhammad is reported to have encouraged the teaching of Surah Yūsuf to slaves, claiming that "whenever a Muslim recites it and teaches it to his family and slaves, Allah would ease for him the pangs of death and make it so that no Muslim would envy him"

Major themes

The faith of the prophets

The faiths of the prophets before Muhammad were the same as his. The prophets Ibrahim, Ishaaq, Ya'qūb and Yūsuf invited the people to the same message as Muhammad.

Character of a Muslim

 Has awareness of Allah and accountability of one's deeds
 Pursues one's goals while remaining under the limits prescribed by the Divine Law
 Believes that success and failure are entirely in the hands of God, that whatever Allah wills will happen and no one can prevent it
 Applies their efforts towards the truth and puts one's trust in Allah

Confidence and courage
Throughout the story of Yūsuf, Allah taught the believers that a person who possesses true Islamic character can master the world with the strength of their character. The example of Yūsuf shows that a person of high and pure character can overcome severe circumstances and be successful.

Objectives of this Surah
 To provide proof that Muhammad's prophethood and his knowledge is not based on unsubstantiated information, rather but was gained through revelation.
 It applies the theme of the story to the people of Quraysh (The tribe of the leaders in Makah) and warns that the conflict between them and Muhammad would end in his victory over them. As stated in verse 7: "Indeed there are signs in this story of Yūsuf and his brothers for the inquirers"

References

External links 
Surah Yusuf Mp3
Quran 12 Clear Quran translation

Yusuf
Joseph (Genesis)